In Combustion, G equation is a scalar  field equation which describes the instantaneous flame position, introduced by Forman A. Williams in 1985 in the study of premixed turbulent combustion. The equation is derived based on the Level-set method. The equation was studied by George H. Markstein earlier, in a restrictive form.

Mathematical descriptionWilliams, Forman A. "Combustion theory." (1985).

The G equation reads as

where
 is the flow velocity field
 is the local burning velocity

Local burning velocity
The burning velocity of the stretched flame can be derived by subtracting suitable terms from the unstretched flame speed, for small curvature and small strain, as given by

where
 is the burning velocity of unstretched flame
 is the term corresponding to the imposed strain rate on the flame due to the flow field
 is the Markstein length, proportional to the laminar flame thickness , the constant of proportionality is Markstein number 
 is the flame curvature, which is positive if the flame front is convex with respect to the unburnt mixture and vice versa.

A simple example - Slot burner

The G equation has an exact expression for a simple slot burner. Consider a two-dimensional planar slot burner of slot width  with a premixed reactant mixture is fed through the slot with constant velocity , where the coordinate  is chosen such that  lies at the center of the slot and  lies at the location of the mouth of the slot. When the mixture is ignited, a flame develops from the mouth of the slot to certain height  with a planar conical shape with cone angle . In the steady case, the G equation reduces to

If a separation of the form  is introduced, the equation becomes

which upon integration gives

Thus the scalar field is

At the flame tip, we have , the flame height is easily determined as

and the flame angle  is given by

Using the trigonometric identity , we have

References

Fluid dynamics
Combustion